Ramazzottius is a genus of water bear or moss piglet, a tardigrade in the class Eutardigrada.

Species
 Ramazzottius affinis Bertolani, Guidetti and Rebecchi, 1993
 Ramazzottius andreevi Biserov, 1998
 Ramazzottius anomalus Ramazzotti, 1962)
 Ramazzottius baumanni Ramazzotti, 1962)
 Ramazzottius bunikowskae Kaczmarek, Michalczyk and Diduszko, 2006
 Ramazzottius cataphractus Maucci, 1974)
 Ramazzottius caucasicus Biserov, 1998
 Ramazzottius edmondabouti Séméria, 1993
 Ramazzottius horningi Binda and Pilato, 1995
 Ramazzottius ljudmilae Biserov, 1998
 Ramazzottius montivagus Dastych, 1983)
 Ramazzottius novemcinctus Marcus, 1936)
 Ramazzottius oberhaeuseri Doyère, 1840)
 Ramazzottius rupeus Biserov, 1999
 Ramazzottius saltensis Claps and Rossi, 1984)
 Ramazzottius semisculptus Pilato and Rebecchi, 1992
 Ramazzottius subanomalus Biserov, 1985)
 Ramazzottius szeptycki Dastych, 1980)
 Ramazzottius theroni Dastych, 1993
 Ramazzottius thulini Pilato, 1970)
 Ramazzottius tribulosus Bertolani and Rebecchi, 1988
 Ramazzottius valaamis Biserov and Tumanov, 1993
  Bertolani and Kinchin, 1993

References

External links

Parachaela
Tardigrade genera
Xerophiles